Saare Tujhyachsathi is an Indian Marathi television serial which was aired on Sony Marathi from 20 August 2018 and stopped on 28 September 2019.

Plot 
It is the story of Shruti and Kartik who come from different backgrounds. Shruti is a boxer and Kartik, a classical singer. Both are passionate about their professions and do not have marriage on their mind. However, on the insistence of their families, they decide to explore the idea of marriage set up. The show explores the nuances of both courtship and arrange marriage.

Cast

Main 
 Gautami Deshpande as Shruti
 Harshad Atkari as Kartik
 Milind Gawali as Shruti's Coach

Recurring 
 Vishakha Subhedar as Shruti's Aunt
 Avinash Narkar
 Sarita Mehendale
 Rakesh Date
 Sonam Pawar
 Bhagyashree Dalvi
 Madhura Joshi
 Gurudatta Divekar
 Manjusha Godse

References

External links 
 
 Saare Tujhyachsathi at SonyLIV

Sony Marathi original programming
Marathi-language television shows
2018 Indian television series debuts
2019 Indian television series endings